Allyn McClelland Stout (October 31, 1904 – December 22, 1974) was a pitcher in Major League Baseball. He played for the St. Louis Cardinals, Cincinnati Reds, New York Giants, and Boston Braves.  On May 7, 1933, he was involved in the trade that brought future Hall of Famer Leo Durocher to the St. Louis Cardinals.

References

External links

1904 births
1974 deaths
Major League Baseball pitchers
St. Louis Cardinals players
Cincinnati Reds players
New York Giants (NL) players
Boston Braves players
Baseball players from Illinois
Sportspeople from Peoria, Illinois